Frank Leslie Coombs (December 27, 1853 – October 5, 1934) was an American lawyer and politician who served one term as a congressman from California from 1901 to 1903.

Life
Frank Leslie Coombs was born in Napa, California, the son of Nathan Coombs and Maria Isabel Gordon. His maternal grandparents were William Gordon (who was a naturalized Mexican citizen originally from Ohio) and Juana Maria Lucero (who was Mexican). Coombs attended the public schools in California and Dorchester High School in Boston, Massachusetts. He graduated from the law department of Columbian University (now George Washington University Law School), Washington, D.C., in 1875. Coombs was admitted to the bar in 1875 and commenced practice in Napa. He was the District Attorney of Napa County from 1880 to 1885.

Coombs was a member of the California State Assembly, serving from 1887 to 1893 and 1897 to 1899, each time representing Napa County, and served as Speaker in 1891 and again in 1897. On the death of John F. Swift, he was appointed United States Minister to Japan and served from June 1892 to August 1893. He was the State Librarian of California from April 1, 1898 to April 1, 1899. Coombs was the United States Attorney for the Northern District of California from April 1, 1899 to March 1, 1901.

Coombs was elected as a Republican to the Fifty-seventh Congress (March 4, 1901 to March 3, 1903) from the 1st congressional district of California. He was an unsuccessful candidate for reelection in 1902 in his redrawn district, which had been renumbered as the 2nd congressional district, losing by 49.2% to 48.3% to Democrat Theodore A. Bell. Coombs resumed the practice of law in Napa, and was again a member of the State Assembly from 1921 to 1931, representing Napa and Lake counties. He died in Napa at age 80, and was buried in Tulocay Cemetery.

See also
List of Hispanic and Latino Americans in the United States Congress
 Elwood Bruner, for Coombs presiding at a heated Assembly meeting

References

External links

1853 births
1934 deaths
Hispanic and Latino American members of the United States Congress
Speakers of the California State Assembly
Hispanic and Latino American diplomats
American librarians
People from Napa, California
George Washington University Law School alumni
United States Attorneys for the Northern District of California
19th-century American diplomats
Republican Party members of the United States House of Representatives from California
19th-century American politicians
20th-century American politicians